Trégastel is a commune in the Côtes-d'Armor department of the region of Brittany in northwestern France.

Trégastel is situated between Perros-Guirec and Pleumeur-Bodou. Lannion is 10 kilometres away.

Population

Inhabitants of Trégastel are called trégastellois in French.

Breton language
The municipality launched a linguistic plan through Ya d'ar brezhoneg in February 2008.

In 2008, 16.5% of primary school children attended bilingual schools.

International relations
The official sister cities of Trégastel are:
 Foz, Spain, since 2003
 Koussané, Mali, since 2004

Religious monuments
 St Laurent Church in the bourg
 Ste Anne des rochers chapel
 St Golgon chapel

The Costaérès castle
In 1892, Bruno Abakanowicz bought a small island called Costaérès in Trégastel, where by 1896 he had erected a neo-Gothic manor.

Marine aquarium of Trégastel
Since 1967, Trégastel has been home to a marine aquarium, built within a large, naturally occurring, outcrop of pink granite rocks.

Gallery

See also
Communes of the Côtes-d'Armor department
Jentilez

References

External links

Official website 

French Wikipedia article on 'Aquarium Marin de Trégastel'
Marine Aquarium of Tregastel's website
Marine Aquarium of Tregastel in English

Communes of Côtes-d'Armor
Seaside resorts in France